Goldie or Goldy is a nickname of:

 George Cochrane (ice hockey) (1881–1952), Canadian ice hockey player
 Goldie Ghamari (born 1985), Canadian politician
 Goldie Goldthorpe (born 1953), Canadian retired ice hockey player
 Goldie Sayers (born 1982), British javelin thrower
 Goldie Thomas (1885–1972), Australian cricketer

Lists of people by nickname